The Cape Spencer Light is an active lighthouse on the Bay of Fundy east of Saint John, New Brunswick. There have been several towers at this site: the first was a wooden house built in 1873, which was succeeded by a concrete tower in 1918. The present fiberglass tower was erected in 1983 to replace a skeletal tower first lit in 1971.

See also
 List of lighthouses in New Brunswick
 List of lighthouses in Canada

References

External links
Picture of Cape Spencer Lighthouse
 Aids to Navigation Canadian Coast Guard

Lighthouses in New Brunswick
Lighthouses completed in 1873
Lighthouses completed in 1918
Lighthouses completed in 1983
1873 establishments in New Brunswick